Pío Romero Bosque (1860 – 10 December 1935) was a Salvadoran politician who served as president of El Salvador from 1 March 1927 until 1 March 1931. He also served as the vice president of Alfonso Quiñónez Molina from 1 March 1923 to 1 March 1927.

He is reputed to be one of the few, if not the only, Salvadoran president who was able to strike a political balance in government during his administration. This balance is often known as the "natural mix" – a balance between concession to demands of the various components of society and repression of the same in a given country. He was a scion of the Meléndez–Quiñónez "dynasty", who, rather than impose his own heir as president, allowed a democratization of the country with its first free elections in 1931, won by Arturo Araujo.

References

1860 births
1935 deaths
People from Cuscatlán Department
Salvadoran people of Spanish descent
Presidents of El Salvador
Vice presidents of El Salvador
Defence ministers of El Salvador